The Big Dirty may refer to:

 The Big Dirty (album), an album by Every Time I Die
 Trailer Park Boys: The Big Dirty, an alternate title for the film Trailer Park Boys: The Movie
 The Big Dirty (player), a player in the videogame Team Fortress 2